Brigitte Kahn is a German-born British actress who has appeared on several television shows in the UK.

She is well known for her part in the Star Wars film The Empire Strikes Back, where she plays an originally unnamed rebel officer who was later named Toryn Farr in other Star Wars media, as one of three female characters with a speaking part in the original Star Wars trilogy other than Princess Leia herself.

Kahn played Dagmar in Auf Wiedersehen, Pet. Other TV credits include: Secret Army, The Sandbaggers, The Gentle Touch, The Professionals, C.A.T.S. Eyes, Taggart, The Bill and The New Statesman.

She starred as the German Baroness in the film The Remains of the Day.

She played Hippolyta in the Royal Shakespeare Company 1989 production A Midsummer's Dream.

References

External links
 

Year of birth missing (living people)
Living people
British television actresses
German emigrants to England